Canada's Deadly Secret: Saskatchewan Uranium and the Global Nuclear System is a 2007 book by Jim Harding, and demonstrates the negative impacts on Aboriginal rights and environmental health, and the effect of free trade. Harding argues that nuclear energy cannot mitigate global warming and that the "Peaceful Atom" does not exist. Helen Caldicott wrote the foreword to the book.

Jim Harding is an emeritus professor of environmental/ justice studies and was director of research for Prairie Justice Research at the University of Regina. He is a founding member of the Regina Group for a Non-Nuclear Society and International Uranium Congress. Harding also acted as Prairie Correspondent for Nuclear Free Press and consultant to the award-winning film Uranium.

Several reviews of the book have been published.

See also
List of books about nuclear issues
Nuclear disarmament
Anti-nuclear movement

References

External links
Nuclear days are past

Nuclear energy in Canada
Uranium mining in Canada
Mining in Saskatchewan
Environmental non-fiction books
2007 non-fiction books
2007 in the environment
Books about nuclear issues
Canadian non-fiction books
Books about Saskatchewan
Energy in Saskatchewan
Climate change books